The 2010–11 Basketball League of Serbia season was the 5th season of the Basketball League of Serbia, the highest professional basketball league in Serbia. It was also 67th national championship played by Serbian clubs inclusive of nation's previous incarnations as Yugoslavia and Serbia & Montenegro.
The 182-game regular season (26 games for each of the 14 teams) began on Saturday, October 9, 2010, and ended on Sunday, March 12, 2011.

Teams for 2010–11 season

Regular season

First League standings 

P=Matches played, W=Matches won, L=Matches lost, F=Points for, A=Points against, D=Points difference, Pts=Points

Super League standings 

P=Matches played, W=Matches won, L=Matches lost, F=Points for, A=Points against, D=Points difference, Pts=Points

Schedule and results of Super League

Playoff stage

Semifinals 
Game 1

Game 2

Game 3

Final 
Game 1

Game 2

Game 3

Bracket

External links 

Basketball League of Serbia seasons
Serbia
1